The Energy Efficiency and Conservation Block Grant (EECBG) is a program in the United States, which provides federal grants to units of local government, Indian tribes, states, and territories to reduce energy use and fossil fuel emissions, and for improvements in energy efficiency.

Administration 
The EECBG Program is administered by the Office of Weatherization and Intergovernmental Programs in the Office of Energy Efficiency and Renewable Energy—EERE of the United States Department of Energy—DOE.

Purpose
The Energy Efficiency and Conservation Block Grants funding will support energy audits and energy efficiency retrofits in residential and commercial buildings, the development and implementation of advanced building codes and inspections, and the creation of financial incentive programs for energy efficiency improvements.

The grant funds could also go towards transportation programs that conserve energy, projects to reduce and capture methane emissions from landfills, renewable energy installations on government buildings, energy efficient traffic signals and street lights, combined heat and power systems, district heating and cooling systems, and other projects.

Legislation 
The Program was authorized in Title V, Subtitle E of the Energy Independence and Security Act of 2007 (EISA), and signed into Public Law (PL 110-140) on December 19, 2007. The American Recovery and Reinvestment Act of 2009 appropriated $3.2 billion for the Energy Efficiency and Conservation Block Grant (EECBG) Program.

See also 
 General Services Administration
 Index—Energy conservation

References

External links
official Energy Efficiency and Conservation Block Grant Program website
Office of Weatherization and Intergovernmental Programs home page — the U.S. EERE (Office of Energy Efficiency and Renewable Energy) Weatherization and Intergovernmental Programs website.

Energy conservation in the United States
Grants (money)
Renewable energy organizations based in the United States
United States Department of Energy
Government programs